is a Japanese map publisher. Founded in 1948, the company is known as a maker of residential maps and software used in personal computers and Automotive navigation systems. It is a leading Japanese company in the production of mapping software.

Head office
Zenrin's head office is in the Zenrin-Asahi Building at 1-1-1, Muromachi, Kokura-Kita Ward, Kitakyūshū. The building stands on the spot where noted Edo period mapmaker Inō Tadataka began his mapping of Kyūshū, in the midst of a modern shopping and cultural center called Riverwalk Kitakyushu. The company also has a development center (Techno Center) at Nakabaru Shinmachi 3–1, Tobata Ward, Kitakyushu.

In the U.S., Zenrin provides navigation software and expertise to Nissan North America, Honda's Internavi in car telematics service in Japan, and other automobile and navigation systems hardware manufacturers. Zenrin is also continuing to explore collaborative efforts with other electronic and auto manufacturers. Field research crews collect data throughout the United States, Canada, Mexico, Brazil, and survey businesses along America's Interstate's to integrate into their navigation software and databases. Businesses, organizations, and travelers nationwide utilize this data in a variety of applications and settings.

International offices
Zenrin USA, Inc., located between San Francisco and Silicon Valley at 1350 Bayshore Hwy, Suite 580, Burlingame, CA 94010 USA (650-615-4200).

Zenrin Europe GmbH, located in Münsterstr. 306, 40470 Düsseldorf, Germany (+49-211-369-780).

President
 has been the President and CEO of Zenrin Co. Ltd., since April 1, 2008. Mr. Takayama joined Zenrin Co. Ltd. in 1986 and has been its Director since 2006. He graduated from the Seinan Gakuen University.

 was president from 1980 until his retirement in 2001. Inheriting the company from his father, he built it into a major company in mapping and vehicle-mounted navigation software. He was also the first president of the StarFlyer airline.

Map museum 
A map museum is located on the on 14th floor of the company's home office building. It is open 10:00-17:00 weekdays, closed weekends and Japanese national holidays. Admission is ¥100.

References

External links

Zenrin Japan website 
Zenrin Europe website
Zenrin USA website
Zenrin DataCom website

Map companies of Japan
Book publishing companies of Japan
Companies based in Fukuoka Prefecture
Publishing companies established in 1948
Japanese brands
Mass media in Kitakyushu
GIS companies
Japanese companies established in 1948
Companies listed on the Tokyo Stock Exchange
Companies listed on the Fukuoka Stock Exchange